Achiroides melanorhynchus is a species of sole native to Southeast Asia.  It was first described by Pieter Bleeker in 1850.

Range
The species is native to tropical brackish and freshwater along the coasts of Cambodia, Thailand, Malaysia, and Indonesia.

References 

Fish described in 1850
Soleidae